Para-Veterinary Institute (PVI) is a sub-campus of University of Veterinary and Animal Sciences, Lahore located at Karor Lal Esan, Layyah, Punjab, Pakistan. The college was established in 2019 as an initiative for para veterinary under special considerations. This institution is located near Government Degree College, bypass road, Tehsil Karor Lal Esan, Layyah. This campus has a covered area of 10 acres where various components (administration block, hostel, outdoor veterinary dispensary, experimental animal shed, laboratory, computer lab, class rooms, residential colony for employees, beautiful parks/lawns, roads) are being established.

PVI is committed for the development of livestock in the province and this sector is passing through a process of changing in accordance with the dynamics of production, healthcare, food security, human resource development and trainings of farmer’s community. 

The Degree programs are accredited by the Pakistan Veterinary Medical Council (PVMC).

Disciplines
 2-years Livestock Assistant Diploma (Morning/Evening)
 2-years Poultry Assistant Diploma (Morning/Evening)
 1-year Dairy Herd Supervisor Diploma
 Training of CLEW’S (Community Livestock Extension Workers)
 Training of AIA’S (Artificial Insemination Assistants)
 Trainings to Livestock farmers/breeders of livestock
 Trainings of the unskilled manpower on livestock production, management etc.

Short courses offered
 Short training of livestock and poultry farmers for basic first aid in their animals in case of emergencies.
 Certification and short diploma courses for A.I.
 Short course on Calf rearing & Diploma in Dairy herd management including care of dam etc.
 Diploma in Poultry husbandry, farming and business proposals
 Short courses on Zoonotic diseases in livestock and poultry & their preventive measures
 Short courses on Infectious/contagious diseases in farm animals
 Short training of butchers for hides safety measures
 Short trainings on Sheep/goat farming
 Short trainings on preservation of fodders in draught condition
 Short trainings on Infertility in animals
 Short training of farmers/Para-vets for dealing with disease outbreaks & its control measures
 Short trainings on fodder and forage production
 Short trainings on Preservation of indigenous breeds e.g. Sahiwal cow/Nili Ravi Buffalo
 Short training of farmers on Fish Farming.
 Short Trainings of VO’s, Para-vet on communication skills and capacity building
 Short trainings on poultry housemen.
 Short training course on Wildlife Keeping/Handling

See also
 Pakistan Veterinary Medical Council
 University of Veterinary and Animal Sciences, Lahore
 Cholistan University of Veterinary and Animal Sciences, Bahawalpur
 University of Veterinary and Animal Sciences (Ravi Campus)
 College of Veterinary and Animal Sciences, Jhang

References

External links
 PVI official website

Veterinary schools in Pakistan
Universities and colleges in Jhang District
University of Veterinary and Animal Sciences